Air Defense Command may refer to:
 Aerospace Defense Command
 Air Defence Command (India)
 Air Defence Command (Canada)